Mary Margaret Cameron (9 March 1865 – 15 February 1921) was a Scottish artist, renowned for her depictions of everyday Spanish life. She exhibited 54 works at the Royal Scottish Academy between 1886 and 1919.

Early life and education

Mary Margaret Cameron was born on 9 March 1865 in Portobello in Edinburgh, the third of six children of Mary Brown Small and Duncan Cameron. Her father was associated with the Edinburgh printing and stationery firm of Macniven and Cameron and the inventor of the "Waverley" pen-nib. Her father also owned The Oban Times newspaper. Her mother was a member of the Smalls of Dirnanean of Perthshire. Cameron was the younger sister of Flora Macaulay – widow of the Rev Robert Blair – who was editor of The Oban Times newspaper until her death in 1958, aged 99.
  
Cameron first began her art education at the age of 16 through the Trustees Drawing Academy of Edinburgh, winning prizes from the age of 17. She took classes at the Edinburgh Veterinary College to perfect her understanding of animal anatomy, and developed a particular skill for depicting horses. This reflected her early interest in unusual subject matter, and was helped by her ability to use her own horse as a model.

Spain 

In 1900, Cameron travelled to Madrid in Spain to study the work of 17th-century Spanish painter, Diego Velázquez. She fell in love with the country, its people and culture. She painted many Spanish scenes, violent and masculine topics such as battlefields, horse racing and particularly bullfights, and lived for a time in Madrid and Seville. She generated controversy in her native Scotland over her realistic portrayal of the sometimes brutal bullfighting scenes.

Career 

Cameron was a founding member of the Edinburgh Ladies' Art Club and the first exhibition of the Society of Scottish Artists, she was later involved with the Royal Scottish Academy, (RSA) but in 1901, when women could exhibit at RSA but not become members, her application was nominated with Pheobe Anna Traquair and Christina Paterson Ross, but no women were elected until 1938, Josephine Haswell Miller. Cameron had three other failed attempts. She exhibited 56 works at the RSA between 1886 and 1919. Her painting, Portrait de Mme. Blair et ses borzois received a "Mention Honorable" at the Paris Salon in 1904. The winning portrait depicted her sister Flora with her two Russian Borzoi dogs at either side. The painting, along with one of Cameron's Spanish paintings, was published in the book Women Painters of the World (1905).

Cameron held four solo exhibitions between 1908 and 1913 in Edinburgh, London and Paris, with a critic praising her  "power, ease and fearlessness".

In addition to being a talented artist, Cameron was also a capable linguist, and spoke French and Spanish fluently. She also had a good knowledge of German and Italian, and knew enough Russian to read and translate it.

On 30 June 1905 Cameron married Alexis Millar, a horse dealer and jobmaster from Edinburgh, at St Martin-in-the-Fields in London. Mary Cameron died at Turnhouse, a hamlet to the west of the Edinburgh, on 15 February 1921, and is buried in Dean Cemetery in Edinburgh. The grave lies in the obscured southern terrace, towards the east end.

Legacy
Cameron has a small number of paintings in the British national collections. A portrait of Cameron at work in her studio, by John Brown Abercromby, is held by the National Gallery of Scotland. She has been described as a 'trailblazer" for women artists and gender equality.

References

External links
Portrait of Mary Cameron in her studio by John Brown Abercromby

After The Storm, Iona
An Edinburgh Halberdier
Auction Results for Mary Cameron
Mary Cameron Reproductions
Mary Cameron at Artfact
Mary Cameron at Artnet

1865 births
1921 deaths
19th-century Scottish painters
19th-century Scottish women artists
20th-century Scottish painters
20th-century Scottish women artists
Alumni of the University of Edinburgh
Artists from Edinburgh
Burials at the Dean Cemetery
People from Portobello, Edinburgh
 Scottish expatriates in Spain
Scottish women painters